The 19337 / 19338 Indore - Delhi Sarai Rohilla Weekly Express is an express train of the Indian Railways, running between  and . It is currently being operated with 19337/19338 train numbers on a weekly basis.

Coach composition

The train has standard LHB rakes with max speed of 110 kmph. The train consists of 20 coaches:

 2 AC II Tier
 4 AC III Tier
 7 Sleeper class
 4 General Unreserved
 1 Pantry car
 2 End-on Generator

Service

19337/Indore–Delhi Sarai Rohilla Weekly Express has an average speed of 52 km/hr and covers 933 km in 17 hrs 55 mins.
19338/Delhi Sarai Rohilla–Indore Weekly Express has an average speed of 50 km/hr and covers 933 km in 18 hrs 35 mins.

Route & Halts 

The important halts of the train are:

Schedule

Rake sharing

The train shares its rake with 19331/19332 Kochuveli–Indore Weekly Express.

Traction

See also

 Indore–New Delhi Intercity Express

Notes

References 

Transport in Indore
Transport in Delhi
Rail transport in Madhya Pradesh
Rail transport in Rajasthan
Rail transport in Haryana
Rail transport in Delhi
Railway services introduced in 2019